Byron Alfred Evard (March 27, 1908 – December 22, 1983) was an American professional basketball player. He played in the National Basketball League for the Fort Wayne General Electrics. In 10 games, he averaged 1.6 points per game. Prior to his NBL career, Evard attended St. Viator College where he played football, basketball, and baseball.

References

1908 births
1983 deaths
American men's basketball players
Basketball players from Fort Wayne, Indiana
Fort Wayne General Electrics players
Guards (basketball)
Sportspeople from Naples, Florida
St. Viator Irish baseball players
St. Viator Irish basketball players
St. Viator Irish football players